The following is a list of the FCC-licensed radio stations in the United States Commonwealth of Massachusetts, which can be sorted by their call signs, frequencies, cities of license, licensees, and programming formats.

List of radio stations

Defunct
WDIS
WFNX
WGAJ
WGI
WGTR
WJDF
WJXP
WMAF
WNEK-FM
WNMH
WNYW
WPAA
WPEP
WPNI
WREB
WRSB
WWQZ
WWTA
WXLJ-LP
WYAJ
WYOB-LP

See also
 List of United States radio networks
 List of television stations in Massachusetts

References 

 
Massachusetts
Radio